Isaac McKim (July 21, 1775 – April 1, 1838) was a U.S. Representative from Maryland, nephew of Alexander McKim. McKim's five terms as a Congressman saw him change parties three times (from Republican to Jackson Republican to Jacksonian).

Early life
Born in Baltimore in the Province of Maryland, McKim attended the public schools, and later engaged in mercantile pursuits.  He served in the War of 1812 as aide-de-camp to General Samuel Smith.

Political career 
After the war, McKim served as a member of the Maryland Senate from December 4, 1821, until January 8, 1823, when he resigned.

McKim was elected as a Democrat to the Seventeenth Congress to fill the vacancy caused by the resignation of Samuel Smith.  On the same day, McKim was elected as a Jackson Republican to the Eighteenth Congress to fill the vacancy caused by the resignation of Representative-elect Smith and served from January 4, 1823, to March 3, 1825.  After Congress, McKim served as one of the original director of the Baltimore & Ohio Railroad Co. from 1827 until 1831.

McKim returned to Congress, elected as a Jacksonian to the Twenty-third and Twenty-fourth Congresses and reelected as a Democrat to the Twenty-fifth Congress. He served from March 4, 1833, until his death in Baltimore, Maryland, on April 1, 1838.  He was interred in the burying ground of St. Paul's Church.

 List of United States Congress members who died in office (1790–1899)

Merchant 
McKim was a "wealthy sea-dog and merchant" and a leader in the commercial and industrial life of Baltimore. He owned a fleet of merchant ships.

Among other businesses he had a copper warehouse on Gay street in Baltimore. Isaac also operated a steam flour mill.

Owner of the Ann McKim
In 1832, he contracted the prestigious Baltimore shipbuilding firm of Kennard & Williamson to build the ship of his dreams, the famous Baltimore clipper Ann McKim, that he named in honor of his wife. It then went on to become the model for many of the clipper ships built over the next 25 years.

Legacy
Isaac McKim finished the building of the first free school in the U.S., McKim Free School, started by his father John McKim.

In 1837, Kennard & Williamson built the 163-ton brig Isaac McKim, that was named after McKim.

There is a cenotaph in his memory at Congressional Cemetery.

References

External links

1775 births
1838 deaths
Democratic Party Maryland state senators
American militiamen in the War of 1812
Baltimore and Ohio Railroad people
19th-century American railroad executives
United States Army officers
Maryland Democratic-Republicans
Democratic-Republican Party members of the United States House of Representatives
Jacksonian members of the United States House of Representatives from Maryland
19th-century American politicians
Democratic Party members of the United States House of Representatives from Maryland
American militia officers